Magné may refer to:

 Magné, Deux-Sèvres, a commune in the Deux-Sèvres department, France
 Magné, Vienne, a commune in the Vienne department, France
 Magné (surname), origin of and people with the surname

See also
 Magne (disambiguation)